Schaake is the family name of:

 Bill Schaake (?–2017), American football coach
 Elmer Schaake (1911–1966), American athlete and coach
  (born 1931), German actress
 Marietje Schaake (born 1978), Dutch politician